Pancho Paskov (born 9 May 1994) is a Bulgarian sabre fencer.

Paskov trained at Sveshnikov Club and at the Vasil Etropolski Academy in Sofia. In the 2011–12 season he won a silver medal at the Mediterranean Championships in Poreč. In the following season, at the age of 17, he reached the table of 64 at the Plovdiv World Cup. 

In 2015 a knee injury compelled him to stop training for months. Lack of funds also prevented him from taking part in World Cup competitions. However, he ranked amongst the top four at the Prague pre-olympic tournament in April 2016, securing his  qualification to the 2016 Summer Olympics. He is the first Bulgarian Olympic fencer since the 1988 Summer Olympics in Seoul. In the men's sabre event he created a surprise by eliminating World No. 1 Alexey Yakimenko in the first round, but he lost in the table of 16 to Germany's Matyas Szabo.

References 

1994 births
Living people
Bulgarian male sabre fencers
Fencers at the 2016 Summer Olympics
Olympic fencers of Bulgaria
Sportspeople from Sofia